The 1984 European Karate Championships (19th edition) were held in Paris, France from 11–13 May 1984.

Medalists

Men's competition

Individual

Team

Women's competition

Individual

Team

References

1984
International sports competitions hosted by France
European Karate Championships
European championships in 1984
International sports competitions hosted by Paris
1984 in Paris
Karate competitions in France
May 1984 sports events in Europe